Campo Alegre is a residential neighborhood located in the Chacao municipality of Caracas, Venezuela. This district holds the hotel Embassy Suites by Hilton , and the most exclusive party room of the city, the "Quinta Esmeralda", meeting point of the Venezuelan upper-class families.

This neighborhood has on average the highest priced real estate in the country and holds as well the embassy of the Republic of Colombia and Portugal.

Campo Alegre borders the Caracas Country Club to the north and west, La Castellana to the east, and El Rosal to the south. It has an estimated area of 32.5 hectares (0.32 square kilometers).

History

In 1932 was born the project of "Campo Alegre", which the architect Manuel Mujica Millán named: "Plane of Garden city, Campo Alegre" (originally "Plano de la Ciudad-Jardín de Campo Alegre"). There we'll see a big number of tree-lined avenues crossing each other between squares from which people can see modern country houses, neo-colonials neo-baroques, Néobasques... In spite of the 'urbicide' that has invaded Caracas in the late 20th century, Campo Alegre still keeps a little of the Garden City that Manuel Mujica initially designed.

See also

Altamira (Caracas)
El Rosal
Caracas
Chacao Municipality
Miranda State

Neighbourhoods of Caracas